Green River Correctional Complex is a state prison located in Central City, Kentucky. It opened in 1994 and had a prison population of 982 as of 2007.

It is a medium security adult male correctional facility and it is operated by the Kentucky Justice and Public Safety Cabinet, Department of Corrections. The prison is on  they have a staff of 254, the annual cost to house the inmates is $11,710.79.

Facility
The complex has three medium security general population housing units that have 444 double bunk cells, one maximum security segregation unit that has 44 single bunked cells and a fifty-bed open dorm style minimum security unit.

Staff
Timothy Lane is the current Warden. The facility has two Deputy Wardens, Patrick Kessinger and Stacey Gibson.

Programs
The Green River Correctional Complex has several programs that the inmates are able to participate in; they are also given educational opportunities.

 Alcohol and Narcotics Anonymous:  A program for both men and women who suffer from alcohol and drug abuse
 Anger Management:  This is a twelve-week class that is based on the book "Houses of Healing: A Prisoner's Guide to Inner Power and Freedom"
 Victims Awareness:  A six-week program that helps the inmate understand the victim's pain
 Family Reunification:  A six-week program that uses videos and homework to help inmates who are leaving prison transition back into family life.
 Life Skills:  A thirty-two-hour course that explores basic skills to live in society
 Life without a crutch:  This is a drug education program based on the book "Life Without a Crutch"
 Pathfinders:  This is a fifteen-week intensive pre-release class that is held three hours for five days a week.
 Practical Parenting:  This is a forty-eight-hour class that deals with the importance of the father being present in his children's lives.
 Prison to the streets:  This is an extensive forty hour transition/re-entry program
 Success after prison:  A ten-hour pre-release course that tells what the expectations are, responsibility, and how to stay out of prison

References

History and Overview

External links
Green River Correctional Complex Website
Visiting Information

Prisons in Kentucky
Buildings and structures in Muhlenberg County, Kentucky
1994 establishments in Kentucky
Central City, Kentucky